Sit Down, Shut Up is a short-lived Australian sitcom broadcast by Network Ten. It ran from 16 February 2001 until 28 June 2001 for a total of 13 episodes.

The series followed the staff and students at a dysfunctional fictional high school called Carpen Heights Secondary College, and focused on the life of the teachers in and out of the staff room.

A writer for the series claimed that producer/comedian Chris Lilley had borrowed ideas for characters and plots from Sit Down, Shut Up for his 2007 series Summer Heights High. The ideas Lilley reportedly borrowed included  the school's name and aspects of the Mr G character.

Cast
Marg Downey as Sue Dirkin
Stephen Curry as Stuart Mill
Jacqueline Brennan as Helen Peters
Christopher Brown as Brent Townsend-Ross
Jodie Dry as Julia Denholm-Ponsford
Paul Gleeson as Felix Sedgely
Taylor Kane as Stefan Ravazzi
Tim Mcloughlan as Chaps
Brendan Reed as Dean Tate

American remake 

In 2009, an animated remake of the series titled Sit Down, Shut Up aired on Fox, premiering on 19 April 2009. This American version featured the voices of Henry Winkler, Will Arnett, Jason Bateman, Will Forte, Kenan Thompson, and Cheri Oteri, Nick Kroll, and Kristin Chenoweth. It was developed by Mitchell Hurwitz, the creator of Arrested Development. Former Simpsons writer Josh Weinstein acted as showrunner. The series received lackluster reviews and was pulled from FOX's Sunday night line-up after four episodes. The program aired all of its episodes when FOX put Sit Down Shut Up on late-night Saturday. Sit Down Shut Up then aired  on Comedy Central (in reruns, initially a number of times throughout the day).

References

External links
Australian Television Information Archive

Australian television sitcoms
Network 10 original programming
Australian high school television series
Australian workplace comedy television series
2000s high school television series
2000s sitcoms
2000s workplace comedy television series
2001 Australian television series debuts
2001 Australian television series endings
English-language television shows
Television series about educators
Television series about teenagers